Prabhu Bamala Chauhan (born 6 July 1969) is an Indian politician who is the current Minister of State for Animal Husbandry Department of Karnataka from 20 August 2019 in B.S.Yediyurappa cabinet. Later he has also sworn in as cabinet minister on 4 August 2020 for a second time in Basavaraj Bommai cabinet and the same portfolio has been allotted. He is a current Member of the Karnataka Legislative Assembly from Aurad Assembly constituency, since 2008  and he was the  Minister in charge of the Bidar district. In Basavaraj Bommai Cabinet he was made Minister in charge of the Yadgiri district.

He has been elected to Karnataka assembly from Aurad, a reserved constituency in 2008 by defeating incumbent MP of Bidar Mr. Narsingrao Suryawanshi. He won subsequent elections in 2013, and 2018 from same Constituency (Aurad). Gopinath Munde, former Deputy CM of Maharashtra, was his mentor. Chauhan is the protégé of ex-MLA from Aurad, Gundappa Vakil.

References 

Karnataka MLAs 2008–2013
Living people
Bharatiya Janata Party politicians from Karnataka
Karnataka MLAs 2013–2018
Karnataka MLAs 2018–2023
1969 births